Ryan Burge may refer to: 

Ryan Burge (footballer) (born 1988), English footballer
Ryan Burge (political scientist), American political scientist